William de Valognes also known as William de Valoynes, was the only son of Philip de Valognes and was granted a charter of the baronies of Panmure and Benvie by King William the Lion, previously granted to his father. On his father's death in 1215, William de Valongnes was made High Chamberlain to Alexander II. He died in 1219 and was interred at Melrose Abbey.

Marriage and issue
William married Lora de Quincy, daughter of Saer de Quincy, 1st Earl of Winchester and Margaret de Beaumont. They had three daughters;
Christina, married Peter Maule of Fowlis, passing the Baronies of Panmure and Benvie into the Maule family; had issue.
Lora, married Henry de Balliol, passing the position of Lord Chamberlain of Scotland into the Balliol family; had issue.
Isabel, married David Comyn, passing the Barony of Kilbride into the Comyn family; had issue.

References

Year of birth unknown
1219 deaths
Scoto-Normans
Lord Chamberlains of Scotland
Burials at Melrose Abbey
William